Jevgeni Novikov (born 28 June 1980) is a Estonian former professional international footballer. He played the position of central and defensive midfielder.

Club career
Novikov started his career in Narva Trans. In 2001, he joined FC Flora Tallinn. He had spells in Ukraine and Russia, playing for Tom Tomsk, in the Russian Premier League. He rejoined FC Flora Tallinn in 2006, but moved to the Russian First Division, after just one season with the club. Again after just a season he moved to the Latvian Higher League to FK Rīga, from where he was loaned to Dynamo Barnaul. His last club was FF Jaro.

Nõmme Kalju
On 23 February 2009, it was announced that Novikov had signed a one-year contract with Nõmme Kalju.

Bradford City A.F.C.
In July 2009, he was given a trial with Bradford City.

FC Okzhetpes
In 2010, he played for FC Okzhetpes in Kazakhstan Premier League.

FF Jaro
On 31 August 2010, he signed a contract with Veikkausliiga club FF Jaro.

FC Levadia Tallinn
In March 2011 he signed with Estonian Meistriliiga club FC Levadia Tallinn.

References

External links
 
 Nõmme Kalju profile
 Jevgeni Novikov: tahan kanda Eesti sinist särki! 

1980 births
Living people
Sportspeople from Narva
FC Flora players
FC Valga players
FC Kuressaare players
Nõmme Kalju FC players
Estonian footballers
Estonia international footballers
Estonian expatriate footballers
Estonian people of Russian descent
FC Zirka Kropyvnytskyi players
Estonian expatriate sportspeople in Ukraine
Expatriate footballers in Ukraine
FC Tom Tomsk players
Russian Premier League players
FC Dynamo Barnaul players
Expatriate footballers in Russia
Estonian expatriate sportspeople in Russia
Latvian Higher League players
FK Rīga players
Expatriate footballers in Latvia
Estonian expatriate sportspeople in Latvia
Kazakhstan Premier League players
FC Okzhetpes players
Estonian expatriate sportspeople in Kazakhstan
Expatriate footballers in Kazakhstan
FF Jaro players
Veikkausliiga players
Expatriate footballers in Finland
Estonian expatriate sportspeople in Finland
JK Narva Trans players
FC Sodovik Sterlitamak players
Ukrainian Premier League players
Association football midfielders
Association football defenders